Avis (Danish/Norwegian for newspaper) is part of the name of the following newspapers:

Norway
Aalesunds Avis, a former newspaper, published in Ålesund
Ås Avis, a weekly newspaper in the municipality of Ås
Brønnøysunds Avis, a print and online newspaper published in Brønnøysund
Enebakk Avis, a newspaper published in Enebakk
Farsunds Avis, a newspaper published in Farsunds
Haugesunds Avis, a daily newspaper published in Haugesund
Hortens Avis, a former newspaper, based in Horten
Moss Avis, a newspaper published in Moss
Rakkestad Avis, a newspaper published in Rakkestad
Rogalands Avis, a newspaper published in Stavanger
Sogn Avis, a newspaper published in Leikanger
Sør-Varanger Avis, a newspaper published in Kirkenes
Stavanger Avis, a newspaper published in Stavanger
Skotfos Avis, a newspaper published in Skotfos
Tvedestrand og Omegns Avis, a former newspaper, published in Tvedestrand
Vesteraalens Avis, a newspaper published in Stokmarknes and covering the district of Vesterålen

Germany
Flensborg Avis, a Danish-language newspaper published in Flensburg, Germany